División de Honor de Béisbol 2013 is the 28th season since its establishment. 2013 season started on March 16 and finished on 4 August.

Only nine teams played the Spanish baseball top league after Halcones de Vigo was relegated to 1ª División A, and no team was promoted.

On July 22, Tenerife Marlins won its sixth title in a row.

Regular season

References

External links
2013 season at rfebeisbolsofbol.com

División de Honor de Béisbol